The Polish Air Force Academy (Polish: Wyższa Szkoła Oficerska Sił Powietrznych (1994-2018); Lotnicza Akademia Wojskowa (since 2018)) is located in Dęblin, eastern Poland. Established in 1927 during the interwar period, the Polish Air Force University is an accredited university for the undergraduate education of officers for the Polish Air Force.

History
Polish Air Force University - "The School of the Eaglets" has changed its name, structure, and fields of study several times. The curricula and methods of theoretical and practical aviation training in the air have changed. All the transformations were dictated by concern for the best execution of the tasks facing the University.

Air Force Officer School

The Air Force Officer School was established on 5 November 1925 in the town of Grudziadz in place of the Pilot Training College. The new school used the college airfield together with its premises and training equipment. Col. Pil. Roman Florer was appointed to organize and manage the newly formed Air Force Officer School.
In accordance with the ordinance on the school establishment and program assumptions,the school offered two-year courses for candidates for pilots and observers - civilians who passed their maturity exam and completed a one-year course in the Infantry Officer Cadet School or in the Reserve Officer Cadet School. The school consisted of the Department of Sciences, managed by the Deputy- Commandant of the Air Force Officer School, and the School Division (since January 1926 – the School Wing) comprising two, and later on, three officer cadet school squadrons.To be admitted into a course at the Air Force Officer School, a candidate was required to pass a competitive exam, including a general knowledge written test and written and oral exams in mathematics and physics. Candidates additionally had to undergo medical examination and psychological testing. The temporary school regulations strictly specified the rights and duties of cadets: "those admitted to the school should be thoroughly concerned with the idea of hard work and service, they should always bear in mind what job they will perform in the future. At every moment, they should prove that it had been the passion for the aviation that made them join the Air Force".In 1926, pursuant to the decision of the Head of the Aeronautics Department at the Ministry of Military Affairs, the pilot training was discontinued and the school limited its program only to the courses for observers. Such a decision significantly limited the training potential of the Air Force Officer School which, as a consequence, became less attractive for young people.

Air Force Officer School - Air Force Officer Cadet School 1925 - 1929

On 14 April 1927 the Air Force Officer School was transferred from Grudziądz to Dęblin. In the new seat, even though not yet fully adjusted to the program requirements, all the facilities needed for aviation training were located in one area. As a result of the massive extension, planned for many years to come, "The School of Eaglets" became one of the most modern aviation schools in the world.
On 15 September 1927, the first cadets completed their education in the school and were sent to aviation regiments as cadet observers. After six months of service, they were promoted to the rank of 2nd Lieutenant.
On 15 August 1928, the first school graduates’ promotion ceremony took place.
The cadets were promoted to the rank of 2nd Lieutenant and obtained the title of Observer. It was the first time in Dęblin when the representative of the President of the Republic of Poland awarded the top student of the school – 2nd Lt. Obs. Bronisław Bogucki - with a Golden Cutlass. Among the 77 graduates, there were the future famous airmen: Zdzisław Krasnodębski (the first commander of No. 303 "Kościuszko" Polish Fighter Squadron),Walerian Jesionowski (the commander of No. 308 "City of Kraków" Polish Fighter Squadron) and Stefan Łaszkiewicz (the first commander of No. 308 "City of Kraków" Polish Fighter Squadron).
The Air Force Officer School, and since 1928 – the Air Force Officer Cadet School, still provided training exclusively for the observers which only intensified the problem of the constantly decreasing number of pilots. Therefore, further changes were required to be introduced in the military aviation education system

Air Force Officer Training Center

The Air Force Officer Training Center was established pursuant to the ordinance of the Head of the Aeronautics Department at the Ministry of Military Affairs of 6 April 1929. The basic task of this Center was to train the candidates for the flying personnel officers during a two-year course and the reserve aviation officer cadets during a one-year course, as well as to improve the skills or re-skill the Air Force officers and to provide the instruction for the young officers directed to the Air Force from other types of armed forces.
The Air Force Officer Training Center comprised: Air Force Officer Training Center Headquarters, Department of Sciences, School Training Unit/Wing, Air Base, Air Force Officer Cadet School, Reserve Officer School, as well as Aircraft Handling Course for Junior Air Force Officers and Training Squadron.
The establishment of the Air Force Officer Training Center expanded opportunities for aviation education in Poland as it not only gave a possibility of training new officers but also created favorable conditions for upgrading professional qualifications and retraining, e.g. for converting observers into pilots or officers of other types of armed forces into observers or pilots. Additionally, officers were offered different levels
of specialized training programs, among others, at squadron or tactical commanders’ training courses. The Center provided instruction not only to new officers but also standardized and upgraded professional qualifications of the mid-level Air Force officers. The Center also developed and promoted a unified military doctrine and views on the use of the Air Force. It was definitely a flagship of the Polish military aviation.
However, it was The Air Force Officer Cadet School, preparing young people for the professional military service, which was the most significant component of the Air Force Officer Training Center. The fact that it functioned within the structures of the Center helped to avoid problems related to logistic support or the organization of theoretical and practical training. The Air Force Officer Cadet School comprised exclusively the School Battalion, namely the subdivision of officer cadets.
The School continued instruction only for observer cadets who having completed a one - or two-year service in an aviation regiment, could apply for admission into a flight training course. In Autumn 1934, the training course for pilot cadets was organized for the first time and only the graduates of the reserve officer cadet schools were called up to attend it. From among 40 cadets who had commenced their training only 30 pilots were promoted to the rank of 2nd Lieutenant in 1936.
In the years 1935 - 1937 the importance of the Air Force Officer Cadet School increased. The School premises were expanded and prepared to offer a longer cycle of study for both pilots and observers. The Department of Sciences was again incorporated into the School structure. Now the School Battalion included four training squadrons. Starting from 1935 the course of study was extended to three years and it comprised: Year I - basic military training, Years II and III - specialized training in the two groups of: pilots and observers.

Air Force Officer Training Center No. 1

In the year 1936 decisions were made to modernize and expand the Polish Armed Forces starting from 1942. The adopted planning assumptions, concerning the enlargement and rearmament of the military aviation intending the purchase of new planes, required approximately 1000 officers of the flying personnel to be trained.
To meet those requirements, the Air Force Officer Training Center was to be reorganized. As a result of the reorganization, the Air Force Training Center No. 1 was formed on 17 July 1937. Additionally, some of the school units were renamed, e.g. the Air Base became the Independent Dęblin Air Base and the Port Division – the Dęblin Air Base Port Division Headquarters).
The Air Force Cadet School was extended. The number of training squadrons was increased to 6 and they were grouped into two school battalions. School Training Unit/Wing was extended to four squadrons: fighter squadron, combat squadron, bomb squadron and observers training squadron. The ultimate aim of the School was to simultaneously train 600 officer cadets.
On 20 August 1937, the independent Air Force Reserve Officer Cadet School was established. The newly constructed airfield with the modern backup facilities in Sadków near the town of Radom became the seat of this new unit. In 1939 the Air Force Training Center No. 1 comprised: Air Force Training Center No. 1 Headquarters, Air Force Officer Cadet School, Air Force Observer Course for Junior Weapon Officers of other types of land forces and Weapon Officers, as well as the Higher School of Aerobatics and Fighter Combat Shooting in Ułęż.

September 1939

Partial mobilization resulted in the fact that in June 1939 the third-year cadets of the Air Force Officer Cadet School stopped their study and were sent to various combat squadrons where they continued specialized training. The second-year cadets, having completed the shortened program of study, passed their exams and in July started the accelerated specialized training. The first-year cadets underwent training according to the wartime training program.
The school ceased to function with the outbreak of World War II and the cadets had to take the most difficult exam in their lives. In September 1939 they were all tested both on the Polish land and at the Polish sky.
Since 2 September 1939 German planes continued bombing the School premises together with its airfield. On 3 September 1939 a decision was made to evacuate the teaching staff, cadets and aviation equipment from Dęblin. Training was planned to be continued on the Lublin airfields but the fast progressing German Army made the plans collapse. Evacuation was continued Eastwards – in the direction of the Wołyń aerodrome. The invasion of the Red Army on 17 September 1939 put an end to all hopes and the teachers and cadets were evacuated to Romania. A part of the teaching staff was taken into captivity by the Russian Army to be murdered in Katyń and Kharkov.
Dęblin and the school airfields were defended in 1939 by the interim Air Force formations, mainly by the Dęblin Fighter Group commanded by Cpt. Pil. Stanisław Brzezina – Commandant of the Flight Training College. The group equipped with only 27 PZL P-7a aircraft was not able to fight against the aggressor on equal footing, however, it stopped the tight German bomber planes’ formations from reaching the target, by distracting them and forcing to cease the attacks. During the aerial combat on 14 and 15 September 1939, Lt. Pil. Henryk Szczęsny, one of the members of the Dęblin group, shot down 2 German He 111 bombers.
In September 1939 the aviation school in Dęblin suffered the same fate as the whole Polish Air Force and the whole Polish Army. The school cadets and the entire school personnel proved their steadfast will to fight for their fatherland. They looked for opportunities to fight for their country in France but they found them in Great Britain.

War Exam

Polish airmen, defeated in September 1939, never accepted defeat. In September 1939 they were crossing the border led by the thought that they would get to the country which would take up the fight. They fought in France and after its defeat – in Great Britain.
In France, Polish Air Force soldiers continued their aviation training.
The Headquarters planned to form a number of aviation squadrons. Even though a full reconstruction of the Polish Air Force was not possible, almost 170 pilots defended the French sky in May and June 1940 (they shot down over 50 German planes). With the defeat of France, there emerged opportunities to fight on “the island of last hope”.
The intent of the reconstruction of a strong Polish Air Force was performed in Great Britain. As early as in 1940, during the Battle of England the Royal Air Force was supported by two Polish fighter squadrons and two bomber squadrons. Altogether fourteen Air Force squadrons were formed within the Polish Air Force which included eight fighter, four bomber, one fighter-reconnaissance and one air observation squadron. At the end of the war, there were over 14,000 soldiers in service in the Polish Air Force with almost 4,000 flying personnel.
Nearly 2,000 Polish airmen died in combat. However, they demanded a very high price for their lives – only the fighter pilots shot down more than 900 German planes and 42 of them were honored with the title of “Fighter Ace”. Successes of such pilots as Skalski, Urbanowicz, Horbaczewski, Gładych, Drobiński, Król, Rutkowski, Arciuszkiewicz and Łokuciewski confirmed the value of the Polish school of aviation. The sacrifice of the Polish airmen was immense but in the fight for freedom and independence sacrifice is unmeasurable. The alumni of “The School of Eaglets” gave their lives for freedom. Can there be anything more precious than that?

Wartime Aviation School of the Polish Army

The first aviation centers commenced their activity on the liberated lands even before the war ended. On 31 October 1944,  the Wartime Aviation School of the Polish Army and the 15th Independent Reserve Air Force Regiment were established in Zamość.
The 1945 January offensive liberated the remaining Polish lands. The situation at that time made it also possible to gradually transfer the school from Zamość. On 20 March 1945 the 3rd, Squadron was rebased at the Dęblin airfield where the practical air training was commenced with the use of UT-2 aircraft. Dęblin became the cradle of the Polish aviation back again.
On 13 April 1945, pursuant to the order of the Supreme Commander of the Polish Armed Forces, the Wartime Pilot School was established in Dęblin. It accelerated the organizational actions related to the establishment of two separate independent schools and as a result, on 19 April the school personnel and equipment started being transferred from Zamość to Dęblin. The last transports reached Dęblin on 25 April 1945. It was decided that the Technical Military Air Force School would remain in Zamość.
Training in Dęblin was conducted in extremely hard conditions, being the effect of the extensive war damage. Additional difficulties resulted from the fact that the Russian school staff did not speak the Polish language. Nevertheless, the wartime educational program, though shortened, was realized effectively.
On the turn of 1946 and 1947, the school returned to the peacetime training program. Teaching personnel was gradually reduced, Russian commanders and instructor staff were systematically replaced by the Polish professionals, didactic process got upgraded and the length of the training courses – prolonged to three years.
In March 1947, the school was reorganized and renamed into the Air Force Officer School. The subject reorganization comprised also the training squadrons themselves. The 1st and the 2nd Squadron were merged to form the 1st Strike Fighter Squadron consisting of two units. It was based in the town of Radom. The 3rd Squadron was transformed into the 2nd Navigator, Gunner and Bomb Pilot Training Squadron. The 4th Squadron stationing in Dęblin was transformed into the 3rd Basic Training Squadron.

The Academy as a Higher Education Institution

On the 1st of January 1968, the Officer Training College (OSL) was granted university status and thus was renamed the Air Force Officer Training College (WOSL). On the 17th of March 1968, the first matriculation of cadets was held in "The School of the Eaglets". At that period, the College underwent extensive expansion. Its structure included many subordinate units located in various places
of the country.
On the 1st of October 1994, the College was renamed "The Polish Air Force Academy" (PAFA). Since the Act on higher education dated from 27th July 2005 came into force, in which legislators abolished the Act of 31st March 1965 on higher military education and incorporating military higher education institutions into the national (common) system of higher education, PAFA has been a vocational higher education institution with one first degree course only for soldiers (engineering studies at the major of aeronautics and aerospace). At that period, the Academy was not allowed to conduct civilian studies.
According to the Decision no. Z-63/Org/P1 issued by the Minister of National Defence on the 22nd of September 2008, with the beginning of 2009 PAFA became directly subordinate to the Minister of National Defence.
In 2009, the Academy started offering courses also for civilian students.

Polish Air Force University

According to the ordinance of the Ministry of National Defence of 28th August 2018, the Polish Air Force Academy changed its name into Polish Air Force University.
Currently, at two faculties, one institute and department, the Polish Air Force University offers four majors of study in full-time, extramural and postgraduate mode of study.
Furthermore,professional training and qualifying for the next officer’s rank are conducted. The University is legally entitled to confer the title of Doctor of Philosophy in the scientific field of study - "machine construction". Additionally, it is applying for conferring the title of Doctor of Philosophy in the scientific field of study - "geodesy and cartography".

Education

Faculty of Aviation

The Faculty of Aviation is an organisational unit of the university. Its main task is to educate military and civilian students in aviation and aeronautics. It also conducts scientific and research activities in engineering and technical sciences, as well as activities aimed at the continuous improvement of the research performed and teaching offered. The faculty has the right to confer the degree of doctor of technical sciences in the construction and operation of machines. Furthermore, it conducts postgraduate studies related to this specialisation, mainly for officers, along with the training of professional staff for the needs of the national armed forces. An important role of the faculty is the organisation and coordination of the educational process within the courses performed, as well as the preparation of military and civil personnel. Furthermore it supports the creating of a patriotic attitude among the students.

Faculty of Aviation Safety

The main aim of the Faculty of Aviation Safety is to provide students with specialized knowledge and skills, as well as to conduct up to date research on aviation safety and security. A considerable effort is provided as concerns training of students on how to apply theoretical and empirical research results in practice. To convey national and historical values that represent the strongest base of patriotism and devotion to the country is of core importance of the faculty teaching programme offered.
The faculty provides degree courses for civilian students and specialized development training programmes for the personnel of the Polish army.

Institute of Navigation

The Institute of Navigation is an organizational unit of the university. Its main task is to educate military and civilian students in air navigation, air traffic management, satellite navigation systems (GNSS), meteorology and geographical information systems (GIS). Furthermore, the institute conducts scientific and research activities in engineering and technical sciences, in the discipline of civil engineering and transport, as well as activities aimed at continuous improvement of the research and a teaching base. The institute has well-equipped laboratories that are used for scientific and didactic purposes, including: Satellite Navigation Techniques Laboratory; Laboratory of GNSS Signal Simulation and Navigation Data Tele-transmission; GNSS Satellite Navigation Laboratory; Aviation Meteorology Laboratory; Geoinformation Laboratory; Laboratory of Aeronautical Message Handling System – AMHS.

Institute of Logistics and Transport

The Institute of Logistics and Transport is an organizational unit of the university. Formerly it belonged to the Faculty of National Security and Logistics which was established in 2010. The department staff has been developing dynamically since its beginning regularly acquiring highly qualified lecturers. The department conducts classes both for  military and civilian students.

General Education Department

The Department of General Education is an independent organizational unit of the university. 

Foreign Languages Center

The Foreign Languages Centre (FLC) is based within the university. Language training is delivered through two in-house language delivery functions: English Language Training for General Purposes and English Language Training for Specific Purposes.
Through language delivery courses, course participants are enabled to pursue their professional training and  interact with fluency and confidence in their operational environment. The courses are aimed at acquiring language skills up to the SLP level required by Defence, underpinned by the NATO STANAG and/or ICAO LPR required by the CAA/Defence and/or CEFR level required by the Ministry of Science and Higher Education. The courses integrate language and subject matter contents so that students can develop language proficiency while simultaneously exploring subjects relevant to their professional arena. With its state-of-the-art language laboratories and well equipped classrooms, FLC provides an excellent training environment. Its greatest assets, however, are people - English language instructors, both military and civilian, linguists and SMEs have a wide range of training experience and are committed to the mission of delivering the highest quality language training and contributing to defence education. They  constantly upgrade their professional skills by participating in various professional training courses in Poland and abroad. 
Students studying with us are given the chance to experience life on an Air Force base, staying in excellent accommodation, enjoying the social life and making the most of  the sports facilities offered by the university.

Faculties
Cadets undergo training in one of the following specialties:
 Jet Fighter Pilot
 Helicopter Pilot
 Transport Airplane Pilot
 UAV Operator
 Navigator
 Air Traffic Controller
 Logistics

Civilian students undergo training in one of the following specialties:
 Aircraft pilotage
 Avionics
 UAV operation
 Air traffic control
 Exploitation of airport navigational infrastructure
 National security
 Logistics

In 2009 the university launched a civilian program with four faculties: airplane pilot, aircraft maintenance, air traffic control and national security. In 2011 the Department of National Safety and Logistics was created, giving the full range of aviation faculties to choose.

Equipment

Many other aircraft visit Dęblin Air Force Base on daily basis including  Mig-29, F-16, PZL W-3 Sokół, C-295.

In 2009 Civil Aviation Authority gave the green light to Academic Flight Training Center.

References

Air force academies
Polish Air Force
Ryki County
Universities and colleges in Poland
Educational institutions established in 1927
1927 establishments in Poland